Burayka was a Palestinian Arab village in the Haifa Subdistrict. It was depopulated during the 1947–1948 Civil War in Mandatory Palestine on May 5, 1948. It was located 29 km south of Haifa.

History
The  Crusaders called the place for Broiquet. In 1265, Burayka was among the villages and estates sultan Baibars allocated to his amirs after he had expelled the Crusaders. Half of the income from Burayka went to his emir Jamal al-Din Musa b. Yaghmur, the other half to emir 'Alam al-Din Sanjar al-Hilli al-Ghazzawi.

Ottoman era
In 1882, the PEF's Survey of Western Palestine (SWP)  described it  as "a small village on a hill-top, with a well to the north, and wooded country round." A population list from about 1887 showed that  Bureikeh had about 115 inhabitants, all Muslim.
A school, founded in 1889 during the Ottoman period, was located in the village, but was closed during the British Mandate period.

British Mandate era
In the 1922 census of Palestine, conducted by the  British Mandate authorities,  Ibraikeh had a population of 249,  all Muslims, increasing in the 1931 census  to 237, still all Muslims, in  45 houses.

In the 1945 statistics   the village had a population of 290 Muslims,  and Arabs had a total of 1,864  dunams of land  according to an official land and population survey.   Of this, 78 dunams were for plantations and irrigable land,  1,538 for cereals, while 15  dunams were built-up (urban) land.

1948, aftermath
Initially, the villagers did not want to take part in the war, and they opposed garrisoning    ALA militiamen in their village.

According to  Yishuv sources, the AHC had in early March, 1948, ordered the villagers to evacuate, so that it could serve as a base for Arab irregular forces, However, most of the villagers seems to have stayed in the village at this stage.  The village was finally depopulated in early May, in the aftermath of the Battle of Mishmar HaEmek, when IZL attacked the remaining  villages in the area with mortar fire.

Today, a civilian explosives factory is located on the site.

References

Bibliography

External links
Welcome To Burayka
Burayka,  Zochrot 
Survey of Western Palestine, Map 8:  IAA, Wikimedia commons 

Arab villages depopulated prior to the 1948 Arab–Israeli War
District of Haifa